Daphnella curta is a species of sea snail, a marine gastropod mollusk in the family Raphitomidae.

This is a ttaxon inquirendum.

Description
The length of the shell attains 4.5 mm, its diameter 2 mm.

(Original description) The abbreviate, white shell is ovate. The short spire is transversely, regularly finely granulosely ridged. Longitudinally it is indistinctly striate. The aperture is rather open and measures about one-half the length of the shell.

Distribution
This marine species occurs off the Tuamotu Islands

References

curta
Gastropods described in 1868